The first season of You Can Dance - Po prostu Tańcz. The dancers compete to win PLN 100,000 and a 3-month scholarship in dance school Broadway Dance Center, but first they have to go through auditions. Later, 50 contestants do the workshops abroad - this season in Paris, France. This seasons on choreography camp special guest choreographer was Wade Robson. From sixteen people, two dancers are eliminated in each episode (In the semi-final episode there was one contestant eliminated), to the final episode that features the top three contestants. The show is hosted by Kinga Rusin. The judges are Agustin Egurrola, Michał Piróg and Weronika Marczuk-Pazura. It premiered on 5 September 2007. Maciej Florek was announced as the winner on 2 December 2007.

Auditions
Season Background Song: Right Here, Right Now - Fatboy Slim
Open auditions for this season were held in the following locations:
 Bytom, 27 July 2007
 Wrocław, 29 July 2007
 Poznań, 31 July 2007
 Gdańsk, 3 August 2007
 Warszawa 5 August 2007

The song during Sneek Peeks at the end of the episode is Just Lose It - Eminem

Top 50 dancers
During the auditions judges picked 50 dancers. These dancers were taking part in choreography camp in Paris, France.

These dancers were shown only in youcandance.tvn.pl website extras.

These dancers earned the tickets after choreography round.

Choreography Camp (Paris) week 
Judges: Agustin Egurrola, Weronika Marczuk-Pazura, Michał Piróg

Top 16 Contestants

Women

Men

Elimination chart

Performance nights

Week 1: Top 16 
Group Dance: The Way I Are — Timbaland ft. D.O.E. (Hip-Hop; Choreographer: Anthony Kaye)	
Guest Dancers:			
Kamil Kucharzewski - 12-year-old boy, who auditioned in Wrocław - (Electric Boogie) - Born 2 Dance - Sonic Division	
Top 16 Couple dances:

Bottom 3 Couples solos:			
			
Eliminated:			
Magdalena Choroszy		
Artur Frontczak

Week 2: Top 14
Group Dance: Hey Boy, Hey Girl — Chemical Brothers (House/Stepping; Choreographer: Filip Czeszyk)		
Top 14 Couple dances:

Bottom 3 Couples solos:			
			
Eliminated:			
Magdalena Góra	
Zbigniew Karbowski

Week 3: Top 12 (24 October 2007)

Group Performance: Bring Me to Life — Evanescence
Top 12 Couple dances:

Bottom 3 Couples solos:

Eliminated:
Magdalena Góra
Zbigniew Karbowski
New partners:
None. Now that only the top ten remain, new partners are randomly assigned each week
Rafał "Tito" Kryla did not perform due to injury, in next episode he has to perform his solo in bottom. He was substituted by choreographer - Piotr Jagielski

Week 4: Top 10 (31 October 2007)

Group Performance: Numb/Encore — Linkin Park & Jay-Z
Top 10 Couple dances:

Bottom 3 Couples solos:

Eliminated:
Ida Nowakowska
Błażej Ciszek

Week 5: Top 8 (7 November 2007)

Group Performance: Please Don't Stop The Music — Rihanna
Top 8 Couple dances:

Bottom 3 Couples solos:

Eliminated*:
Maria Foryś
Piotr Gałczyk

Week 6: Top 6 (14 November 2007)

Group Performance: Fever — Michael Bublé
Couple dances:

Top 6's solos:

Eliminated:
Natalia Madejczyk
Rafał "Kryla" Tito

Week 7: Semi-Finale - Top 4 (21 November 2007)

Group Performance: Fame - Irena Care/Wait a Minute - Pussycat Dolls & Timbaland
Couple dances:

Top 4's solos:

Eliminated:
Diana Staniszewska

Week 8: Finale - Top 3 (2 December 2007)

Group Performance: Top 16: (I've Had) The Time of My Life - Dirty Dancing soundtrack

Top 10 Performances:
The Song during Top 10 Performances is Gotta Work - Amerie

Top 3's solos:

Results:
Winner: Maciej "Gleba" Florek
Runner Up: Rafał "Roofi" Kamiński
3rd Place: Anna Bosak

First for any So You Think You Can Dance series
On semi-finale show there was first ever House performance on series ever. It was performed by Maciek Florek and Rafał Kamiński.

Rating Figures

External links
So You Think You Can Dance Poland Official Website

Season 01